Nathan Frederick Spielvogel (10 May 1874 – 10 September 1956) was an Australian author of Jewish origin, whose work has been compared to that of Judah Waten.

History

Spielvogel was born in Ballarat, Victoria, a son of Neuman Frederik (c. 1830 – 29 October 1891) and Hannah Spielvogel née Cohen  (c. 1844 – 21 January 1901). His father, generally called "Newman", was a tailor and pawnbroker, born in Kolomea, Galizia, Austria (now in western Ukraine) and his mother in Chodsiesen, Prussia (now in Poland). They married at the synagogue, Barkly Street, Ballarat, on 25 December 1867.

Spielvogel was educated at Dana Street State School, Ballarat, and had his Bar Mitzvah on 21 May 1887.
His first published poem, "Mike Hardy's Fate" was published in the Ballarat Courier of 1894, and in 1898 The Bulletin began publishing his verses and stories under several noms de plume.

He taught in various Victorian rural schools, including Dimboola, Orbost Longwood, where a whispering campaign accused him of being German, Mitcham, Wangaratta, and back to his old school at Dana Street, Ballarat, retiring in 1939.

In 1904, he visited Egypt, England, Germany, France, Italy and Switzerland, writing of his experiences in A Gumsucker on the Tramp, "gumsucker" being a colloquialism for a country Victorian. The book sold 10,000 copies and encouraged him to write another book, The Cocky Farmer.

He contributed to The Lone Hand, The Bulletin, and Dimboola Banner as  "Genung", "Eko", "Ato", "Ahaswar".

Family
Spielvogel had two brothers: Frederick Isaac Spielvogel (27 December 1868 – 1947) and Solomon "Sol" Spielvogel (14 November 1875 – 6 September 1958)

He fell in love with a Gentile girl, but following his mother's wishes married Jessie Muriel Harris, daughter of Henry Harris (publisher of the Hebrew Standard) at the Great Synagogue, Sydney on 6 September 1911.

They had three sons, Laurie, Bill and Phil:
Newman Laurence Spielvogel (4 March 1913 – ) known as Laurie, passed his qualifying examination at age nine, a record. 
Lassalle Harris Spielvogel (12 June 1914 – ) known as William?
Frederick Phillip Spielvogel (28 March 1916 – ) known as Phillip.
All three married outside the Jewish faith and away from Ballarat.

His grandson Dennis Spielvogel (1953-2020), the youngest of three brothers, was a member of the Ballarat & District Genealogical Society and founding president of the Bungaree Historical Society.

Writings

Published works
A Gumsucker on the Tramp (1905), on his travels through Europe and Egypt
The Cocky Farmer (1907)
The Gumsucker at Home (1913)
Our Gum Trees (verse, 1913)
The Affair at Eureka (1928), a popular history of the Eureka Stockade
Old Eko's Notebook (1930), reflections on his life as a country teacher
The Call of the Wandering Jew (1940)
Selected Stories of Nathan Spielvogel (1956)
The Spielvogel Papers, vol I (articles and radio talks 1974)
The Spielvogel Papers, vol II (articles and radio talks 1981)

Miscellaneous
The Wandering Jew, no doubt the source of his pseudonym "Ahaswar".
From around 1920 he wrote a monthly piece for the Victorian Teachers' Journal
A history of the Ballarat Hebrew congregation 1855–1928

Other interests
He was a keen chess player
He was intensely interested in the history of the Ballarat area, and longtime president of the Ballarat Historical Society.
After his retirement, he was heavily involved with the local museum.
He was both an intensely patriotic Australian and a committed Jew.

References 

1874 births
1956 deaths
Australian writers
Australian headmasters